ATC '65 is a football club from Hengelo, Netherlands, currently playing in the Tweede Klasse. The club won a championship in the Tweede Klasse in the 2006–07 season.

ATC stands for A Triginta Conditum, Latin for "Founded by thirty", since the club was founded by a group of 30 men.

External links
 Official website 

Football clubs in the Netherlands
Association football clubs established in 1965
1965 establishments in the Netherlands
Football clubs in Overijssel
Sport in Hengelo